Osina may refer to:

Bulgaria 
Osina, Blagoevgrad Province

Nigeria 
Osina, Ideato North, Imo State

Poland 
 Osina, Łódź Voivodeship
 Osina, Lublin Voivodeship
 Osina, Goleniów County, West Pomeranian Voivodeship
 Osina, Myślibórz County, West Pomeranian Voivodeship
 Gmina Osina, Goleniów County, West Pomeranian Voivodeship